Jernej Slivnik (born 26 November 2000) is a Slovenian paralympic skier from Hrušica. 

Slivnik was involved in a car crash in 2006 where he sustained a spinal cord injury; his father and sister were killed in the accident. In 2009, he was introduced to Para skiing. He started competing in 2015 and represented Slovenia as the sole participant at the 2018 and 2022 Winter Paralympics. He competed in slalom and giant slalom in the sitting category; his best result was in slalom in 2018 where he finished 12th. 

Slivnik lives in Hrušica and is friends with ice hockey player Anže Kopitar who also comes from that town.

References 

2000 births
Living people
Slovenian male alpine skiers
Alpine skiers at the 2018 Winter Paralympics
Alpine skiers at the 2022 Winter Paralympics